Wrestling World 2001 was a professional wrestling event produced by New Japan Pro-Wrestling (NJPW). It took place on January 4 in the Tokyo Dome. Wrestling World 2001 was the tenth January 4 Tokyo Dome Show held by NJPW. The show drew 52,000 spectators. The focal point of Wrestling World 2001 was a tournament to crown a new IWGP Heavyweight Champion, which accounted for five of the nine matches on the show. No other championships were defended in 2001, marking the first year that only one title was on the line. The show saw Toshiaki Kawada wrestle twice; Kawada had previously been one of the main event wrestlers of NJPW's biggest rival All Japan Pro Wrestling.

Production

Background
The January 4 Tokyo Dome Show is NJPW's biggest annual event and has been called "the largest professional wrestling show in the world outside of the United States" and the "Japanese equivalent to the Super Bowl".

Storylines
Wrestling World 2001 featured professional wrestling matches that involved different wrestlers from pre-existing scripted feuds and storylines. Wrestlers portrayed villains, heroes, or less distinguishable characters in scripted events that built tension and culminated in a wrestling match or series of matches.

Results

IWGP Heavyweight Championship tournament bracket

References

External links
NJPW.co.jp 

2001 in professional wrestling
2001 in Tokyo
January 2001 events in Japan
2001